Minuscule 695 (in the Gregory-Aland numbering), ε327 (von Soden), is a Greek minuscule manuscript of the New Testament, on parchment. Palaeographically it has been assigned to the 13th century. The manuscript is lacunose. Scrivener labelled it by 599e.

Description 

The codex contains the text of the four Gospels on 299 parchment leaves (size ), with some lacunae. The text is written in one column per page, 20 lines per page. It lacks text of Matthew 1:11-15:18.

It contains Epistula ad Carpianum and the Eusebian tables at the beginning. There is also division according to the Ammonian Sections (in Mark 241), with a references to the Eusebian Canons. It contains Prolegomena, lectionary markings, incipits,  (lessons), Synaxarion, Menologion, ornamented headpieces, and subscriptions at the end.

Text 

Kurt Aland did not place the Greek text of the codex in any Category.

According to the Claremont Profile Method it has mixed text in Luke 1, mixed Byzantine text in Luke 10 relatively close to Kx, and Kx in Luke 20.

History 

Scrivener and Gregory dated the manuscript to the 13th century. Currently the manuscript is dated by the INTF to the 13th century.

The manuscript was bought in 1862 from H. S. Freeman, former consul in Janina.

It was added to the list of New Testament manuscript by Scrivener (599) and Gregory (695).

It was examined by S. T. Bloomfield and Dean Burgon. Gregory saw the manuscript in 1883.

The manuscript is currently housed at the British Library (Add MS 24373) in London.

See also 

 List of New Testament minuscules
 Biblical manuscript
 Textual criticism

References

Further reading 

 S. T. Bloomfield, Critical Annotations: Additional and Supplementary on the New Testament (1860).
 W. H. P. Hatch, Facsimiles and descriptions of minuscule manuscripts of the New Testament, LXX (Cambridge, 1951).

Greek New Testament minuscules
13th-century biblical manuscripts
British Library additional manuscripts